Elkhart station is a train station in Elkhart, Indiana, served by Amtrak's Capitol Limited between Chicago and Washington D.C, and Lake Shore Limited between Chicago and New York City/Boston. While the station has a waiting room, it is only open in early mornings and late evenings, half an hour before the first westbound and eastbound train arrives. It does not have a ticket agent, but the station does have personnel that can assist riders upon departure and arrival. The station is directly across the tracks from the National New York Central Railroad Museum.

History 
Elkhart station was originally built in 1900 by the Lake Shore and Michigan Southern Railway and had a freight house installed across the tracks in 1907. The building is constructed of red brick trimmed with limestone, which is used for the window surrounds and belt course. The station was originally set amid a well-kept garden that displayed neat beds of colorful flowers and a row of trees along the tracks; this manicured landscape was not only a pretty introduction to the city for first time visitors, but it also buffered the streets of downtown from the noise and dirt associated with steam engines and freight trains. The station and the railroad were acquired by the New York Central Railroad in 1914. NYC merged with the Pennsylvania Railroad in 1968, and passenger service was taken over by Amtrak in 1971. The freight house became the National NYC Museum in 1987.

Transit connections 

MACOG Interurban Trolley's Elkhart-Goshen (Red) route stops near the station. However, because of the way the train schedules are currently set up, riders can only connect to westbound trains. Riders who wish to board eastbound trains would have to arrive several hours ahead of time. Elkhart-Goshen (Red) route connects to westbound Capitol Limited and Lake Shore Limited trains.

References

External links

Elkart Amtrak Station (USA Rail Guide -- Train Web)
National New York Central Railroad Museum (Official Site)

Amtrak stations in Indiana
Former New York Central Railroad stations
Railway stations in the United States opened in 1900
Transportation in Elkhart, Indiana
Transportation buildings and structures in Elkhart County, Indiana